Streptomyces rishiriensis is a bacterium species from the genus of Streptomyces which has been isolated from soil in Hokkaido in Japan. Streptomyces rishiriensis produces coumermycin A1, notomycin, 2-chloroadenosine, phosphophenylalanarginine and lactonamycin.

Further reading 
 
 }

See also 
 List of Streptomyces species

References

External links
Type strain of Streptomyces rishiriensis at BacDive -  the Bacterial Diversity Metadatabase

rishiriensis
Bacteria described in 1965